Rajiv Tomar (born 31 December 1980) is an Indian wrestler. He represented India in the men's freestyle 120 kg category at the 2008 Summer Olympics in Beijing, but lost to Steve Mocco of United States in qualifications.

He is from Malakpur in Baghpat district in Uttar Pradesh.

He is Arjun Award Winner 2010 (Wrestling). He also won Indian style wrestling event, Hind Kesari.

Rajiv won Silver Medal in Men's freestyle 125 kg wrestling event in 2014 Commonwealth Games in Glasgow. He has won Bharat Kesari Title 32 times. He learnt Kushti in Guru Hanuman Akhara by Coach Shri Mahasingh Rao. He won bronze medal in Asian Championship in year 1998. He was a powerful wrestler in 120 kg in India and world. He won silver medal in Oman in year 2005. He had won Gold medal in Commonwealth games Canada in 2007. He got Arjun Award in 2010. He is a wrestler in Indian Style Dangal wrestling. He got married in 2011 to a Professor in Delhi University.

See also
India at the 2008 Summer Olympics

References

External links
 
 
 

1980 births
Living people
Indian male sport wrestlers
Olympic wrestlers of India
Wrestlers at the 2008 Summer Olympics
Commonwealth Games medallists in wrestling
Commonwealth Games silver medallists for India
Wrestlers at the 2014 Commonwealth Games
Asian Games competitors for India
Wrestlers at the 2010 Asian Games
Sport wrestlers from Uttar Pradesh
Recipients of the Arjuna Award
People from Baraut
Medallists at the 2014 Commonwealth Games